Santiniketan Medical College (SMC), established in 2021, is a private/Public-Private partnership medical college located in Santiniketan, Bolpur, West Bengal, India. It offers the Bachelor of Medicine and Surgery (MBBS) degree course. The college is recognized by the National Medical Commission and affiliated with the West Bengal University of Health Sciences. The hospital associated with this college is the Bolpur Subdivisional Hospital. Smc is also the India's 1st PPP medical College under National medical commission Act.

References

External links

 

Medical colleges in West Bengal
Affiliates of West Bengal University of Health Sciences
Universities and colleges in Birbhum district
2021 establishments in West Bengal